Gary Faulkner may refer to:

 Gary Brooks Faulkner, construction worker and landlord captured in Pakistan in 2010 hunting for Osama bin Laden
 Gary Faulkner Jr., American ten-pin bowler